DIBP may refer to:

 Department of Immigration and Border Protection of Australia
 Diisobutyl phthalate